Vivian Kleiman is a Peabody Award-winning documentary filmmaker. She has received a National Emmy Award nomination for Outstanding Individual Achievement in Research  and executive produced an Academy Award nominated documentary.

Kleiman directed and produced the feature documentary No Straight Lines: The Rise of Queer Comics (2021), which chronicles queer history in the U.S. through the stories of five featured comic book artists — Alison Bechdel, Jennifer Camper, Howard Cruse, Rupert Kinnard, and Mary Wings. The film premiered in June 2021 at Tribeca Film Festival, Sheffield Doc/Fest, and AFI DOCS. It has screened at film festivals worldwide, and took home the Documentary Feature Grand Jury Prize at Outfest and the NLGJA: Association of LGBTQ Journalists Award for Excellence in Documentary Journalism. 

In 2019, Kleiman was awarded a Eureka Fellowship of the Fleishhacker Foundation, a fellowship program for visual artists by invitation only.

Also an educator, she served as Adjunct Faculty at Stanford University's Graduate Program in Documentary Film and Video Production from 1995–2004.

Kleiman was a long time collaborator with Black gay filmmaker Marlon Riggs. They founded Signifyin' Works in 1991, which creates and distributes films about the experiences of African Americans.  Directed by Riggs, their 1992 film Color Adjustment screened at the Sundance Film Festival and received the International Documentary Association's IDA Award, the Erik Barnouw Award from the Organization of American Historians and the George Foster Peabody Award in 1993.

Selected filmography

As executive producer
 Pool Stories, work in progress (Director Vicky Funari
 Near Normal Man 28 minutes, 2017 (Director Charlene Stern)
 Last Day of Freedom, animated documentary/transmedia project. KQED Truly California, 32 minutes, 2015 (Directors Dee Hibbert-Jones and Nomi Talisman). Academy Award nominated
 Strong! PBS, ITVS, one hour, 2012. (Director Julie Wyman)
 Passion & Power, 74 minutes, 2007.  (Directors Emiko Omori and Wendy Slick)
 Hope Along the Wind (Director Eric Slade) PBS, ITVS
 The Key of G PBS, ITVS, one hour, 2007. (Director Robert Arnold)
 Maquilapolis: City of Factories PBS, ITVS, one hour, 2006. (Directors Vicky Funari and Sergio dela Torre)
 First Person Plural PBS, POV and ITVS, one hour, 2000. (Director Deann Borshay)

As producer
 Forgotten Fires PBS, ITVS, one hour, 1998. (with Michael Chandler)
 Roam Sweet Home PBS, ITVS, one hour, 1996. (with Ellen Spiro)
 Color Adjustment PBS, POV, 90 minutes,  PBS, POV series, 90-minutes, 1992 (with Marlon Riggs) 
 Routes of Exile: A Moroccan Jewish Odyssey 1982 (with Gene Rosow & Howard Dratch)

As director/producer
 No Straight Lines: The Rise of Queer Comics (world premiere Tribeca Festival 2021)
 Families Are Forever Commissioned by the Family Acceptance Project, 21 minutes, 2013
 Audience Award, LA Outfest; Best Documentary Short, Sebastopol Documentary Film Festival
 Always My Son Commissioned by the Family Acceptance Project, 16 minutes, 2011
 Profiles of Change Commissioned by Rubicon Programs, 8 minutes, 2011
 Bianca's Journey Commissioned by the Family Acceptance Project, 8 minutes, 2010
 The Meaning of Food  PBS, 3 x 60 minute series, 2005 (also Series Producer)
 My Body's My Business  16 minutes, 1992.
 Out For The Count Commissioned by Lavender Message Project, 14 minutes, 1992.
 Ein Stehaufmannchen Commissioned by Shana Films, 40 minutes, 1991.

As consultant or writer 
 Wu-Tang Clan: Of Mics & Men, (Director Sascha Jenkins) Story Consultant, 4 part series, Showtime, 2019 
 Strike Anywhere Films - (founded by Barry Jenkins) feature-length documentary, Writer, 2018 (work-in-progress)
 Something Ventured  - Consulting Producer, 85 minutes, PBS (Directors Dayna Goldfine & Dan Geller), 2011.
 Ripe for Change - Consulting Writer, one hour, PBS (Director Emiko Omori), 2005.
 The Cockettes- 100-minutes, PBS (Directors David Weissman and Bill Weber), 2002.

Selected awards 
 George Foster Peabody Award
 Grand Jury Prize, Best Feature-Length Documentary, OutFest Film Festival, Los Angeles, 2021.
 Eureka Fellowship, The Fleishhacker Foundation
 National Emmy Award Nomination for Outstanding Individual Research
 Outstanding Documentary Award, International Documentary Association
 Erik Barnouw Award, Organization of American Historians
 National Owl Award, AARP
 Prized Pieces, National Black Programmers Association
 Crystal Heart Award, Heartland Film Festival

References

External links 
 
 
 

American documentary film producers
American documentary film directors
Living people
American women documentary filmmakers
Year of birth missing (living people)
21st-century American women